Shooting was an event at the 2007 Canada Games held in Whitehorse, Yukon.

Team Air Pistol

Individual Air Pistol

Team Air Rifle

Individual Air Rifle

2007 Canada Winter Games